Ombarrops! is the third and final studio album by Polish alternative rock band The Car Is on Fire. It was produced and mixed by John McEntire (Tortoise, The Sea and Cake, Gastr del Sol) and recorded in Soma Electronic Music Studios in Chicago. Guest appearances are made by McEntire himself and Aleksandra Tomaszewska (Aleks and the Drummer).

Track listing

2009 albums
The Car Is on Fire albums